Robin Amos  is an American keyboardist and founding member of the band Cul de Sac. His first band was The Girls, a punk band that Amos founded in the late seventies with George Condo, Mark Dagley and Daved Hild. He continued to explore that band's sound with his next band Shut Up, which he formed with guitarist Glenn Jones.

References 

American male singers
American rock keyboardists
American rock singers
Cul de Sac (band) members
Singers from Massachusetts
Year of birth missing (living people)
Living people